Emil Bellander (born 5 January 1994) is a Swedish footballer who plays as a forward. His dad is American and his mom is Swedish.

References

External links

1994 births
Living people
Swedish footballers
Association football forwards
Gefle IF players
IF Brommapojkarna players
Åtvidabergs FF players
Sandvikens IF players
Allsvenskan players
Superettan players
Ettan Fotboll players
Swedish people of American descent
Sweden youth international footballers
Footballers from Uppsala